Tokyu Land is a Japanese company. It is listed on the Nikkei 225.

References

External links 

Real estate companies based in Tokyo
Companies listed on the Tokyo Stock Exchange